"The Return of Doctor Mysterio" is an episode of the British science fiction television series Doctor Who. First broadcast on BBC One on 25 December 2016, it is the twelfth Christmas special since the show's revival in 2005. It was written by Steven Moffat and directed by Ed Bazalgette. The episode received generally positive reviews from critics.

The only episode of 2016, it stars Peter Capaldi as the Twelfth Doctor, and is the first to feature Nardole (Matt Lucas), who was introduced in the previousChristmas 2015episode "The Husbands of River Song", as his companion. The episode is set in New York City, and involves the Doctor and Nardole linking with journalist Lucy Fletcher (Charity Wakefield) and a superhero called The Ghost (Justin Chatwin) to combat brain-swapping aliens.

Plot
In New York City on Christmas Eve of 1992, an 8-year-old boy named Grant wakes to find the Twelfth Doctor dangling outside the window of his family's apartment and helps him come into his bedroom. Taking Grant to the rooftop, the Doctor (whom Grant calls "Doctor Mysterio") reveals he accidentally set off a trap for a device he was building, and he enlists Grant to help complete it. However, Grant mistakenly swallows a wish-granting gemstone needed for the device, believing it to be medicine for a cold he has, effectively being granted his wish to be a superhero. Abandoning the device, the Doctor makes Grant promise to not use his new superpowers before he leaves.

The Doctor returns to New York in 2016 with Nardole, whom he removed from Hydroflax's body and rebuilt, to investigate Harmony Shoals, a multinational research company. They encounter a news reporter, Lucy Fletcher, who is conducting a similar investigation. The group discovers that it is being secretly run by a group of living alien brains that transplant themselves into any living creature they need for their plans. They witness the killing of the company's owner, Mr Brock, for his body. Tracked down by Dr Sim, an employee the brains already took over, the group is suddenly rescued by a masked superhero named the Ghost, who afterwards transports Lucy close to her home. Returning to her apartment before her, the Ghost transforms back into Grant, who works for Lucy as a nanny. He is shocked to find the Doctor and Nardole waiting for him, having tracked him down via the gemstone fused inside his body.

When Lucy returns and interrogates the Time Lord by squeezing a stress toy she calls "Mr. Huffle", the Doctor reveals to her that the alien brains colonise planets by taking control of their prominent leaders, with Earth being their next target. Leaving Lucy to prepare for an interview with Grant's alter ego, the Doctor and Nardole track down the alien's ship in a low orbit and board it via the TARDIS. There, they discover that the ship's reactor is in a critical state and realise from Dr Sim that he intends to drop it on New York. Remembering an observation made by Nardole, the Doctor realises the city would be vaporised except for the Harmony Shoals building. World leaders would then take shelter in the company's other buildings within each capital city, believing Earth was under attack, effectively allowing the brains to take them over. After Dr Sim lets slip the ship is to be dropped at a designated time, the Doctor forces its descent ahead of schedule.

Ghost and Lucy are captured by the brains during the interview. They plan to transplant themselves into Ghost's body. Ghost flees to deprive the brains of their prize, then returns as Grant to protect Lucy. Unable to change the ship's course during its descent, the Doctor sends Grant a message requesting his help. Grant manages to stop the alien's ship from crashing into the city, but reveals himself as the Ghost to Lucy in the process. Lucy is won over and Grant takes her in tow as he disposes of the ship. The Doctor alerts UNIT, which shuts down Harmony Shoals, unaware that the alien brain in Dr Sim has escaped within one of their soldiers.

Back at Lucy's apartment, Grant informs the Doctor he will no longer use his powers and retire his costumed identity. As the Time Lord leaves, Lucy asks him why he is sad. The Doctor gives only a vague answer before departing. Nardole privately reveals that the Doctor is mourning the loss of River Song, but will ultimately recover. He leaves with the Doctor to assist him further.

Continuity
At the beginning of the episode, the Doctor is constructing a device to reverse the paradoxes created during his previous visit in "The Angels Take Manhattan" (2012). The Doctor mentions that he usually gets "an invasion" every Christmas, a reference to the different invasions of Earth taking place during most Doctor Who Christmas specials.

The unnamed brain-swapping aliens last appeared in the 2015 Christmas special "The Husbands of River Song", where they were servants of King Hydroflax. Their main agent, Scratch, stated that they represented "the Shoal of the Winter Harmony."

The Doctor tells Lucy that he works for Scotland Yard, which he also did in "The Woman Who Lived" (2015). Previously, the Tenth Doctor told the guests at Lady Eddison's manor he was a chief inspector from Scotland Yard in "The Unicorn and the Wasp" (2008), while the Eleventh Doctor told President Richard Nixon he was an undercover operative from Scotland Yard (code-named "The Doctor") in "The Impossible Astronaut" (2011).

A cinema near Lucy's apartment features a film called The Mind of Evil, the name of a Third Doctor serial.

Nardole mentions that the Doctor cut him out of Hydroflax's body, referring to off-screen events following "The Husbands of River Song" where he was decapitated and his head placed inside the artificially intelligent robotic body of King Hydroflax.

When the Doctor complains that Grant promised him never to use his powers, Nardole brings up the Time Lord policy of never interfering with other peoples or cultures, first mentioned in the Second Doctor serial The War Games (1969).

When clearing out the headquarters of Harmony Shoals, a UNIT officer prepares to contact Osgood, referring to Petronella Osgood who previously appeared in "The Day of the Doctor" (2013), "Death in Heaven" (2014) and "The Zygon Invasion" / "The Zygon Inversion" (2015).

Both the Doctor and Nardole refer to the final 24-year night the Doctor spent with River Song ("The Husbands of River Song") and her eventual death in the Library ("Forest of the Dead").

Outside references
The character of "The Ghost" is a pastiche of the comic book superhero Superman, with several references to the character being made throughout the special:

 Superman's creators, Jerry Siegel and Joe Shuster, are referenced when Mr Brock directs the gathered reporters to ask further questions of "Miss Shuster and Ms. Siegel".
 Grant has roughly the same standard powers of Superman, including flight, super-strength, super-speed, being bulletproof, and possessing X-ray vision, along with other unconventional powers. He gains his abilities from a stellar-powered object (a gemstone made from a star, in the episode), much as Superman gains his from Earth's yellow sun.
 The Harmony Shoals building in New York featured in the episode has a large globe on top of it, making it resemble the Daily Planet building, a major setting of Superman stories.
 Grant prefers being called "mild-mannered", as Superman's alter ego is often characterized. He also follows the same moral code as Superman when operating as the Ghost, and transforms in a similar fashion by tearing open his shirt to reveal his superhero costume underneath.  
 The special features a number of elements that mimic those from Richard Donner's Superman: The Movie. One scene involves the Ghost voicing his hope that Lucy's close call at Harmony Shoals hasn't put her off journalism, paralleling the same scene in the film in which Superman hopes Lois is not put off from flying after he rescues her from falling out of a helicopter. Lucy also conducts a rooftop interview with the Ghost reminiscent of Lois' interview with Superman in the film.
 Lucy Fletcher is named after Lois Lane's sister Lucy. Her character is similar to Lois' in that she does not realize that her old high school friend and current nanny is the superhero Ghost. The initials "L.L." used by several characters of the Superman comics (including Lois Lane, Lana Lang, Lex Luthor, Linda Lee, Lori Lemaris, Letitia Lerner, Lena Luthor and Lyla Lerrol) is used in Lucy's married name: Lucy Lombard.

Several characters from Marvel Comics decorate the walls of young Grant's bedroom. The Doctor questions Spider-Man's unusual origin of being bitten by a radioactive spider; he opines that radiation poisoning would be the likely result. A "Joe's Pizza" is shown within the city, which is where Peter Parker worked briefly in the movie Spider-Man 2. The Doctor counsels Grant that "with great power comes great responsibility," an adage associated with Spider-Man.

Batman is briefly referenced after the Ghost drops Lucy off at her apartment building. When the baby monitor he is carrying goes off, Lucy mistakes it for a signal device and asks if the Bat-Signal is now an app.

"Doctor Mysterio", the name Grant uses for The Doctor is the title used for the spanish dub of the classic series.

The Doctor uses the augmented reality game app Pokémon Go to create a distraction at Harmony Shoals' Tokyo headquarters.

Promotion
The episode was revealed and the first trailer was shown at the 2016 New York Comic Con on 7 October 2016. A preview clip was shown as part of the Children in Need broadcast on 18 November 2016.

Broadcast

Cinemas
The episode received cinema screenings in Australia and New Zealand on 26 December 2016, in Canada on 26 and 28 December 2016, and in the United States on 27 and 29 December 2016.

Broadcast and reception
The episode had an official rating of 7.83 million viewers in the UK with a 31.2% share, making it the 6th most watched show on Christmas Day 2016. The overnight rating was 5.68 million, a share of 27.1% of the total TV audience. The episode received an Appreciation Index score of 82. It also received 1.7 million viewers on BBCA, was BBC America's top telecast of the year across all key demographics, and was the most talked about Christmas Day television programme on Facebook and Twitter.

Critical reception

The episode received generally positive reviews from critics. It holds a score of 89% on Rotten Tomatoes based on 18 reviews, with an average score of 7.89. The site's consensus reads "The Return of Doctor Mysterio is a welcome return of Doctor Who after a year's absence, with the added fun of seeing Steven Moffat take a heroic swing at his version of a Superman story."

The Daily Telegraph gave a positive review of five out of five stars and summarized that the episode was "a romp with a classic feel and cross-generational appeal". Andrew Billen writing in The Times gave the programme four stars out of a possible five. Billen said that Capaldi was at his warmest and that Nardole (Matt Lucas) "added panto brio to an already exuberant episode". The Guardian gave a positive review of The Return of Doctor Mysterio saying "Capaldi takes Manhattan!" ... "Cosmic baddies are inserting alien brains into world leaders’ heads in the Christmas special. It’s timely, top-of-the-tree fun – and Peter Capaldi and Matt Lucas are a pantomime treat".

IGN said "“The Return of Doctor Mysterio” is a pretty lightweight entry in the Twelfth Doctor’s oeuvre, which considering the events of last season isn’t necessarily a bad thing. But the different elements of the episode don’t come together as smoothly as they could, and the emotional through line for the Doctor is treated mostly as an afterthought" but gave it 7.0 out of 10. The A.V. Club gave a mixed review saying that "Doctor Who takes a jolly detour to superhero goofiness".

Home media
The episode was released on DVD and Blu-ray in the United Kingdom on 23 January 2017, with a U.S. release following on 21 February 2017.

References

External links

 
 
 

Twelfth Doctor episodes
Doctor Who Christmas specials
Doctor Who stories set on Earth
Television superheroes
Television episodes set in New York City
2016 British television episodes
British Christmas television episodes
Television episodes written by Steven Moffat
Parodies of Superman